Ahmet Ege Gürleyen (born 26 April 1999) is a German professional footballer who plays as a centre-back for SV Wehen Wiesbaden.

Club career
Gürleyen began his football career in Berlin and played for the U-17 teams of Hertha Zehlendorf and Tennis Borussia Berlin. For the 2016–17 season he moved to 1. FSV Mainz 05, where he started on the U-19 team and from 2018 for the second team in the Regionalliga. In the summer of 2018 he traveled with the professional team to a training camp in Venlo in the Netherlands and was used once as a substitute in the subsequent 2018-19 Bundesliga season. In October 2018 he signed a professional contract until 2022, but continued to play in the second team.

In February 2020, Gürleyen was loaned out to the Austrian Football Second League club FC Liefering, who was coached by Bo Svensson, his former coach in Mainz 05. During the loan spell, he made two appearances in the 2nd division for Liefering. After his return to Mainz 05 he played four times for the second team in the Regionalliga Südwest in the 2020–21 season.

On 5 October 2020 he was loaned out to 3. Liga club SV Wehen Wiesbaden until the end of the season.

References

External links
 
 
 

Living people
1999 births
German people of Turkish descent
Citizens of Turkey through descent
German footballers
Turkish footballers
Footballers from Berlin
Association football central defenders
Germany youth international footballers
Turkey youth international footballers
Hertha Zehlendorf players
Tennis Borussia Berlin players
1. FSV Mainz 05 II players
1. FSV Mainz 05 players
FC Liefering players
SV Wehen Wiesbaden players
Bundesliga players
2. Liga (Austria) players
Regionalliga players
German expatriate footballers
German expatriate sportspeople in Austria
Turkish expatriate sportspeople in Austria
Expatriate footballers in Austria